Charles Foley may refer to:
 Charles Foley (footballer) (1856–1933), played in three FA Cup Finals for Old Etonians
 Charles Foley (inventor) (1931–2013), invented the game Twister, together with Neil W. Rabens
 Charles Foley (journalist) (born 1909), Indian-born British journalist
 Charles Foleÿ (playwright) (1856–1933), French playwright
 Charles F. Foley, American lawyer and politician